The I Tatti Renaissance Library is a book series published by the Harvard University Press, which aims to present important works of Italian Renaissance Latin Literature to a modern audience by printing the original Latin text on each left-hand leaf (verso), and an English translation on the facing page (recto).  The idea was initially conceived by Walter Kaiser, former professor of English and Comparative Literature at Harvard and director of the Villa I Tatti. Its goal is to be the Italian Renaissance version of the Loeb Classical Library. James Hankins, Professor of History at Harvard University, is the General Editor.

Many of the books in the series have never been translated into English before, and the series promises to increase the understanding of the Renaissance among the general public and non-specialist historians by making primary sources accessible, thus giving a window into the minds of Renaissance thinkers themselves.

The books of The I Tatti Renaissance Library have a consistent appearance: a pale blue cover, analogous to the red (Latin) or green (Greek) books in the Loeb Classical Library. They are, however, closer
in size to a standard hardcover book than to the pocket-sized books of the Loeb series. A typeface named "ITRL", based on the work of Renaissance typographer Nicolas Jenson, was specially designed for the series. The books are notable for their overall readability. Anthony Grafton  said of the Latin texts: "though not full, critical editions, [they] are correct, well punctuated and readable. The English translations have an unusual clarity, elegance and precision".

The series is named after the Villa I Tatti in Florence, which houses the Center for Italian Renaissance Studies of Harvard University.

Publication history
 Famous Women, Giovanni Boccaccio, ed. and trans. Virginia Brown, 2001
 Paperback available in 2003
 History of the Florentine People, Volume 1, Leonardo Bruni, ed. and trans. James Hankins, 2001
 Volume 2 available in 2004
 Volume 3 available in 2007, trans. James Hankins and D.J.W. Bradley
 Platonic Theology, Volume 1, Marsilio Ficino, ed. James Hankins, trans. Michael J.B. Allen, 2001
 Volume 2 available in 2002
 Volume 3 available in 2003
 Volume 4 available in 2004
 Volume 5 available in 2005
 Volume 6 available in 2006
 Humanist Educational Treatises, ed. and trans. Craig W. Kallendorf, 2002
 Paperback available in 2008
 On Discovery, Polydore Vergil, ed. and trans. Brian P. Copenhaver, 2002
 Biographical Writings, Giannozzo Manetti, ed. and trans. Stefano U. Baldassarri and Rolf Bagemihl, 2003
 Momus, Leon Battista Alberti, ed. Virginia Brown, ed. and trans. Sarah Knight, 2003
 Commentaries, Volume 1, Pius II, ed. Margaret Meserve and Marcello Simonetta, 2004
 Volume 2 available in 2007
 Volume 3 available in 2018
 Invectives, Francesco Petrarca, ed. and trans. David Marsh, 2004
 Paperback available in 2008
 Later Travels, Cyriac of Ancona, ed. and trans. Edward W. Bodnar, 2004
 Short Epics, Maffeo Vegio, ed. and trans. James Hankins and Michael C.J. Putnam, 2004
 Silvae, Angelo Poliziano, ed. and trans. Charles Fantazzi, 2004
 Humanist Comedies, ed. and trans. Gary R. Grund, 2005
 Italy Illuminated, Volume 1: Books I-IV, Flavio Biondo, ed. and trans. Jeffrey A. White, 2005
 Volume 2: Books V–VIII, 2016
 Lyric Poetry. Etna, Pietro Bembo, ed. and trans. Mary P. Chatfield, trans. Betty Radice, 2005
 Baiae, Giovanni Gioviano Pontano, ed. and trans. Dennis G. Rodney, 2006
 Letters, Volume 1, Angelo Poliziano, ed. and trans. Shane Butler, 2006
 Baldo, Volume 1, Teofilo Folengo, ed. and trans. Ann E. Mullaney, 2007
 Volume 2 available in 2008
 Ciceronian Controversies, ed. Joann Dellaneva, trans. Brian Duvick, 2007
 History of Venice, Volume 1, Pietro Bembo, ed. and trans. Robert W. Ulery, Jr., 2007
 Volume 2 available in 2008
 Volume 3 available in 2009
 On The Donation of Constantine, Lorenzo Valla, ed. and trans. G. W. Bowersock, 2007
 Paperback available in 2008
 Commentaries on Plato, Volume 1: Phaedrus and Ion, Marsilio Ficino, ed. and trans. Michael J. B. Allen, 2008
 Volume 2: Parmenides, Part 1, ed. and trans. Maude Vanhaelen, 2012
 Volume 2: Parmenides, Part 2, ed. and trans. Maude Vanhaelen, 2012
 Essays and Dialogues, Bartolomeo Scala, ed. and trans. Renee Neu Watkins, 2008
 Lives of the Popes, Volume 1: Antiquity, Bartolomeo Platina, ed. and trans. Anthony F. d' Elia, 2008
 Poems, Cristoforo Landino, ed. and trans. Mary P. Chatfield, 2008
 Writings on Church and Reform, Nicholas of Cusa, ed. and trans. Thomas M. Izbicki, 2008
 Christiad, Marco Girolamo Vida, ed. and trans. James Gardner, 2009
 Latin Poetry, Jacopo Sannazaro, ed. and trans. Michael C. J. Putnam, 2009
 Odes, Francesco Filelfo, ed. and trans. Diana Robin, 2009
 Republics and Kingdoms Compared, Aurelio Lippo Brandolini, ed. and trans. James Hankins, 2009
 Book on Music, Florentius de Faxolis, ed. and trans. Bonnie J. Blackburn and Leofranc Holford-Strevens, 2010
 The Hermaphrodite, Antonio Beccadelli, ed. and trans. Holt Parker, 2010
 Sacred Painting. Museum, Federico Borromeo, ed. and trans. Kenneth S. Rothwell, Jr., 2010
 Genealogy of the Pagan Gods, Volume 1: Books I–V, Giovanni Boccaccio, ed. and trans. Jon Solomon, 2011
 Volume 2: Books VI–X, 2017
 Humanist Tragedies, ed. and trans. Gary R. Grund, 2011
 Letters to Friends, Bartolomeo Fonzio, ed. Alessandro Daneloni, trans. Martin Davies, 2011
 Modern Poets, Lilio Gregorio Giraldi, ed. and trans. John N. Grant, 2011
 Dialectical Disputations, Volume 1: Book I, Lorenzo Valla, ed. and trans. Brian P. Copenhaver and Lodi Nauta, 2012
 Volume 2: Books II-III, 2012
 Dialogues, Volume 1: Charon and Antoninus, Giovanni Pontano, ed. and trans. Julia Haig Gaisser, 2012
 Volume 2: Actius, 2020
 Volume 3: Aegidius and Asinus, 2020
 Poems, Michael Tarchaniota Marullus, trans. Charles Fantazzi, 2012
 Latin Poetry, Girolamo Fracastoro, trans. James Gardner, 2013
 Notable Men and Women of Our Time, Paolo Giovio, ed. and trans. Kenneth Gouwens, 2013
 On Exile, Francesco Filelfo, ed. Jeroen De Keyser, trans. W. Scott Blanchard, 2013
 On Methods, Volume 1: Books I-II, Jacopo Zabarella, ed. and trans. John P. McCaskey, 2013
 Volume 2: Books III-IV. On Regressus, 2014
  On the World and Religious Life, Coluccio Salutati, trans. Tina Marshall 2014
 On Married Life. Eridanus, Giovanni Gioviano Pontano, trans. Roman Luke 2014
 The Lepanto Battel, ed. and trans. Elizabeth R. Wright, Sarah Spence, Andrew Lemons, 2014
 Political Writings, Coluccio Salutati, ed. Stefano U. Baldassarri, trans. Rolf Bagemihl,, 2014
 Correspondence, Lorenzo Valla, ed. and trans. Brendan Cook, 2014
 Life and Early Travels, Cyriacus of Ancona, ed. and trans. Charles Mitchell, Edward W. Bodnar, Clive Foss, 2015
 On Dionysius the Areopagite, Volume 1: Mystical Theology and The Divine Names, Part I, Marsilio Ficino, ed. and trans. Michael J. B. Allen, 2015
 Volume 2: The Divine Names, Part II, 2015
 Apologetic Writings, Girolamo Savonarola, ed. and trans. M. Michèle Mulchahey, 2015
 Fiammetta. Paradise, Ugolino Verino, ed. and trans. Allan M. Wilson, 2016
 The Greek Classics, Aldus Manutius, ed. and trans. N. G. Wilson, 2016
 A Translator’s Defense, Giannozzo Manetti, ed. Myron McShane, trans. Mark Young, 2016
 My Secret Book, Petrarch, ed. and trans. Nicholas Mann, 2016
 Angelinetum and Other Poems, Giovanni Marrasio, trans. Mary P. Chatfield, 2016
 Rome in Triumph, Volume 1: Books I–II, Flavio Biondo, ed. Maria Agata Pincelli, trans. Frances Muecke, 2016
 Selected Letters, Volume 1, Petrarch, trans. Elaine Fantham, 2017
 Volume 2 available in 2017
 Humanism and the Latin Classics, Aldus Manutius, ed. and trans. John N. Grant, 2017
 Against the Jews and the Gentiles: Books I–IV, Giannozzo Manetti, ed. Stefano U. Baldassarri, Daniela Pagliara, trans. David Marsh, 2017
 Commentary on Plotinus, Volume 4: Ennead III, Part 1, Marsilio Ficino, ed. and trans. Stephen Gersh, 2017
 Volume 5: Ennead III, Part 2, and Ennead IV, 2018
 Latin Poetry, Ludovico Ariosto, ed. and trans. Dennis Looney, D. Mark Possanza, 2018
 On Human Worth and Excellence, Giannozzo Manetti, ed. and trans. Brian P. Copenhaver, 2019
 Greek and Latin Poetry, Poliziano, ed. and trans. Peter E. Knox, 2019
 The Virtues and Vices of Speech, Giovanni Pontano, ed. and trans. G. W. Pigman III, 2019
 Lives of the Milanese Tyrants, Pier Candido Decembrio, ed. Massimo Zaggia, trans. Gary Ianziti, 2019
 Miscellanies, Volume 1, Poliziano, ed. and trans. Andrew R. Dyck, Alan Cottrell, 2020
 Volume 2 available in 2020
 Life of Giovanni Pico della Mirandola. Oration, Giovanni Francesco Pico della Mirandola, Giovanni Pico della Mirandola, ed. and trans. Brian P. Copenhaver with Michael J. B. Allen, 2022
 Eclogues. Garden of the Hesperides, Giovanni Pontano, ed. and trans. Luke Roman, 2022
 Portraits of Learned Men, Paolo Giovio, ed. and trans. Kenneth Gouwens, 2023
 Biographical and Autobiographical Writings, Leon Battista Alberti, trans. Martin McLaughlin, 2023

References

External links
 The I Tatti Renaissance Library, at Harvard University Press.
 Villa I Tatti - The Harvard University Center for Renaissance Studies

Renaissance works
Dual-language series of texts
Harvard University Press books
Renaissance Latin literature
Translations into English